Francis Luttrell (June 1659 to 25 July 1690) of Dunster Castle in Somerset was a landowner and MP for Minehead from 1679 until his death.

Personal details
Francis Luttrell was baptised on 16 June 1659, second son of Francis Luttrell (1628–1666), and his wife Lucy Symonds, granddaughter of the politician John Pym. He had an older brother Thomas (1657-1670) and a younger Alexander (1663-1711).

In July 1680, he married Mary Tregonwell, a wealthy heiress with an estate worth £2,500 per annum, much of which was spent refurbishing Dunster Castle, the family home. They had a son Tregonwell (1683-1703) and two daughters.

Career

Educated like other members of his family at Christ Church, Oxford, he was first elected MP for Minehead in March 1679, when still technically underage. He retained the seat until his death in 1690 and served as Deputy Lieutenant of Somerset from 1681 to 1687, Deputy Lieutenant of Dorset from 1685 to 1687, and Vice-Admiral of Somerset from 1685. He resigned these offices after refusing to back James II of England in his demand for repeal of the Test Act.

As a colonel in the local militia, Luttrell had helped suppress the Monmouth Rebellion in June 1685 but in the November 1688 Glorious Revolution he backed James' removal by his son-in-law William of Orange. When William landed in Devon, Francis mustered a number of companies of infantry, which formed the basis for the later Green Howards regiment. He died at Plymouth on 25 July while he and his regiment were awaiting transport to Flanders for service in the Nine Years War.

See also 
 Feudal barony of Dunster

References

Sources

 
 

1659 births
1690 deaths
Alumni of Christ Church, Oxford
English MPs 1679
English MPs 1680–1681
English MPs 1681
English MPs 1685–1687
English MPs 1689–1690
Francis
Deputy Lieutenants of Dorset
Deputy Lieutenants of Somerset
Green Howards officers